Lake Fúquene is a heart-shaped lake located in the Ubaté-Chiquinquirá Valley, part of the Altiplano Cundiboyacense, in the north of Cundinamarca, Colombia, at the border with Boyacá.

Due to drainage of the waters for agriculture and dairy farming, the lake levels have dropped drastically in recent years and many flora and fauna species have disappeared.

Etymology 
In the Chibcha language of the Muisca Fúquene means "Place of swamps covered with fog", "Bed of the fox" or "Holy People", referring to the religious rituals of the Muisca. Muisca means "people" in Chibcha.

History 
Lake Fúquene, the lake in the Ubaté-Chiquinquirá Valley, one of the four major valleys of the Altiplano Cundiboyacense, was an important ritual lake in the culture of the Muisca. It formed the connection between the territories of the zipa in the south and zaque in the north and merchants between the two parts of the Muisca Confederation would pass the lake.

Flora, fauna and environmental issues 
Around 47 bird species visit Lake Fúquene, among them Agelaius icterocephalus bogotensis and Fulica americana. in 1940, more than 80 fauna species were foraging around the lake, a number reduced to 58 in 2014.

In and around the lake 248 plant species have been identified. Some of the flora species are Scirpus californicus, Typha, Ixobrichus exilis bogotensis, and Alnus jorullensis. In recent years, 40% of the biodiversity has disappeared in the past 60 years.

In 2014, around 207,000 inhabitants of the area lived around the lake. Fifty dairy farming industries exist around it, with the most important in Ubaté, Chiquinquirá and Simijaca.

See also 
 Muisca religion
 Lake Guatavita, Iguaque, Suesca, Tota, Siecha Lakes

References

Bibliography

External links 

  Tourism at Lake Fúquene
  La laguna de Fúquene, escenario de concertación y acciones colectivas - WWF

Lakes of the Andes
Lakes of Colombia
Lake Fuquene
Fuquene
Lakes
Sacred lakes
Fuquene
Fuquene
Lake Fuquene